Paraperipatus is a genus of velvet worms in the family Peripatopsidae. The number of legs vary within species as well as among species in this genus and can range from as few as 21 pairs (e.g., in P. ceramensis) up to 27 pairs in males and 29 pairs in females (both in P. papuensis). The maximum number of leg pairs recorded in this genus (29) is also the maximum number of leg pairs found in the family Peripatopsidae. This genus exhibits matrotrophic viviparity, that is, mothers in this genus retain eggs in their uteri and supply nourishment to their embryos, but without any placenta. Species in this genus are found in New Guinea and Maluku, Indonesia.

Species
The genus contains the following species:

 Paraperipatus ceramensis (Muir & Kershaw, 1909)
 Paraperipatus keiensis Horst, 1923
 Paraperipatus lorentzi Horst, 1910
 Paraperipatus novaebritanniae (Willey, 1898) 
 Paraperipatus papuensis (Sedgwick, 1910)
 Paraperipatus vanheurni Horst, 1922

Paraperipatus amboinensis Pflugfelder, 1948, Paraperipatus leopoldi Leloup 1931, Paraperipatus schultzei Heymons, 1912, and Paraperipatus stresemanni Bouvier, 1914 are considered nomina dubia by Oliveira et al., 2012.

References 

Onychophorans of Australasia
Onychophoran genera